ITU-R Recommendation BT.601, more commonly known by the abbreviations Rec. 601 or BT.601 (or its former name CCIR 601) is a standard originally issued in 1982 by the CCIR (an organization, which has since been renamed as the International Telecommunication Union Radiocommunication sector) for encoding interlaced analog video signals in digital video form. It includes methods of encoding 525-line 60 Hz and 625-line 50 Hz signals, both with an active region covering 720 luminance samples and 360 chrominance samples per line. The color encoding system is known as YCbCr 4:2:2.

The Rec. 601 video raster format has been re-used in a number of later standards, including the ISO/IEC MPEG and ITU-T H.26x compressed formats, although compressed formats for consumer applications usually use chroma subsampling reduced from the 4:2:2 sampling specified in Rec. 601 to 4:2:0.

The standard has been revised several times in its history. Its seventh edition, referred to as BT.601-7, was approved in March 2011 and was formally published in October 2011.

Signal format
The Rec. 601 signal can be regarded as if it is a digitally encoded analog component video signal, and thus the sampling includes data for the horizontal and vertical sync and blanking intervals. Regardless of the frame rate, the luminance sampling frequency is 13.5 MHz. The samples are uniformly quantized using 8- or 10-bit PCM codes in the YCbCr domain.

For each 8-bit luminance sample, the nominal value to represent black is 16, and the value for white is 235. Eight-bit code values from 1 through 15 provide footroom and can be used to accommodate transient signal content such as filter undershoots. Similarly, code values 236 through 254 provide headroom and can be used to accommodate transient signal content such as filter overshoots. The values 0 and 255 are used to encode the sync pulses and are forbidden within the visible picture area. The Cb and Cr samples are unsigned and use the value 128 to encode the neutral color difference value, as used when encoding a white, grey or black area.

Primary chromaticities

Slightly different primaries are specified for the 625-line (PAL and SECAM) and 525-line (NTSC SMPTE C primaries) systems. Earlier versions of the standard (prior to BT.601-6, approved in January 2007) did not contain an explicit definition of the color primaries.

Transfer characteristics
Rec. 601 defines a nonlinear transfer function which is linear near 0 and then transfers to a gamma curve for the rest of the luminance range:

Awards 
The CCIR received a 1982–83 Technology and Engineering Emmy Award for its development of the Rec. 601 standard.

See also 
 Digital component video
 YCbCr
 Rec. 709, the corresponding standard for high-definition television (HDTV)
 Rec. 2020, ITU-R Recommendation for ultra-high-definition television (UHDTV)
 ITU-R BT.656, ITU-R Recommendation for parallel and serial transmission formats for BT.601 video
 Pixel aspect ratio

References 

Digital television
Film and video technology
ITU-R recommendations
Color space